Hamidul Islam (born 12 January 1989) is a Bangladeshi cricketer. He made his first-class debut for Rajshahi Division in the 2008–09 National Cricket League on 26 October 2008.

References

External links
 

1989 births
Living people
Bangladeshi cricketers
Rajshahi Division cricketers
People from Rajshahi District